Yankees–East 153rd Street station is a commuter rail stop on the Metro-North Railroad's Hudson Line, serving Yankee Stadium and the Highbridge neighborhood in the Bronx, New York City. It opened on May 23, 2009, and provides daily local service on the Hudson Line.

The station is used during New York Yankees baseball games and New York City FC soccer matches at Yankee Stadium. There is also special service branded "Yankee Clipper" for Yankee games. Selected trains on the Harlem and New Haven lines also stop at this station on game days.

Shuttle trains and Hudson Line trains also transport fans between the stadium and Grand Central Terminal, helping to reduce traffic on the subway lines used to connect to New Jersey Transit and Long Island Rail Road trains at Penn Station.

History
The project was promoted for several decades, and was included in the MTA's annual budget since the 1980s. Despite being part of the old Yankee Stadium renovation plan during the 1970s, plans for the station did not go ahead until the impetus from new Yankee Stadium. Metro-North's Hudson Line had active track near the site. Some connections needed to be altered to provide New Haven Line and Harlem Line service.

The station was designed to serve three Metro-North lines (Hudson, Harlem and New Haven) via existing track connections that were not normally used for passenger service.

The MTA estimated that the project would cost $91 million, including $52 million that it will provide and $39 million that will be provided by New York City. The MTA paid for the new station with $40 million from an account set aside to build a new subway connection to LaGuardia Airport that was canceled due to local community opposition, and $5 million from an existing account that had money set aside for new Yankee Stadium station in prior budgets. It opened on May 21, 2009, a month after the new Yankee Stadium's opening on April 2.

Transit watchdog groups claimed the money to construct the station would have to be diverted from other MTA transportation projects in the region. Several groups have urged the Yankees to pay for part, if not all, of the station's cost, since the Yankees would be the prime beneficiary of the station. The Yankees have said the Metro-North project is separate from their stadium project.

Station layout
The station has two high-level island platforms each 10 cars long. Yankee Clipper trains that use the wye at the Mott Haven interlocking only operate on game days.

In 2018, track maintenance prevented direct Harlem Line and New Haven Line service from operating to the station, forcing riders to transfer at Harlem–125th Street to access Yankee Stadium. In 2019, only New Haven Line service used the wye.

References

External links

 Station from Google Maps Street View (then under construction)
 Station from Google Maps Street View
 Mezzanine from Google Maps Street View
 Platforms from Google Maps Street View

Metro-North Railroad stations in New York City
Railway stations in the Bronx
Railway stations in the United States opened in 2009
Highbridge, Bronx